In mathematical harmonic analysis, Harish-Chandra's Ξ function is a special spherical function on a semisimple Lie group, studied by .

Harish-Chandra used it to define Harish-Chandra's Schwartz space.

 gives a detailed description of the properties of Ξ.

Definition

where

K is a maximal compact subgroup of a semisimple Lie group with Iwasawa decomposition G=NAK
g is an element of G
ρ is a Weyl vector
a(g) is the element a in the Iwasawa decomposition g=nak

References

Harmonic analysis
Representation theory
Special functions